Stenolemus is a genus of thread-legged bug (Emesinae). Species of this genus are noted for preying on spiders.

Species
These 18 species belong to the genus Stenolemus:
 Stenolemus alikakay Redei & Tsai, 2010 g
 Stenolemus annulatus g
 Stenolemus atkinsoni
 Stenolemus bituberus
 Stenolemus crassirostris Stål, 1871 g
 Stenolemus edwardsii
 Stenolemus fraterculus Wygodzinsky, 1956 g
 Stenolemus giraffa
 Stenolemus greeni
 Stenolemus griveaudi Villiers, 1970 g
 Stenolemus hirtipes
 Stenolemus lanipes Wygodzinsky, 1949 i c g b
 Stenolemus lenti Espínola & Silva, 1963
 Stenolemus longicornis (Blatchley, 1925) i c g
 Stenolemus novaki Horváth, 1888 g
 Stenolemus pallidipennis McAtee and Malloch, 1925 i c g
 Stenolemus spiniventris Signoret, 1858 i c g b
 Stenolemus susainathani
Data sources: i = ITIS, c = Catalogue of Life, g = GBIF, b = Bugguide.net

References

Reduviidae